Lilium eupetes is a recently discovered and described epiphytic species of lily from the north of Vietnam.

Lilium eupetes reproduces by seed and vegetatively via the production of bulbils dispersed by wind. When the leaves die back they wither and curl into a circle. This eventually detaches from the stem, and acts as the functional equivalent of a samara, carrying the attached bulbil to a new site.

References

eupetes
Epiphytes
Endemic flora of Vietnam
Plants described in 2008